Arachnodactyly ("spider fingers") is a medical condition that is characterized by fingers and toes that are abnormally long and slender, in comparison to the palm of the hand and arch of the foot. In some cases, the thumbs of an individual with the condition are pulled inwards towards the palm. This condition is present at birth.

Causes
This feature can occur on its own with no underlying health problems, or it can be associated with certain medical conditions, including Marfan syndrome, Ehlers–Danlos syndromes, Loeys–Dietz syndrome, and homocystinuria. It is also seen in congenital contractural arachnodactyly, which is caused by mutation in the gene encoding fibrillin-2 on chromosome 5q23.

Notable cases
It remains unconfirmed whether composer Sergei Rachmaninoff's abnormally large reach on a piano was a result of arachnodactyly due to Marfan syndrome, as the pianist exhibited no other signs of the disease.

It is also uncertain if blues guitarist and vocalist Robert Johnson's long fingers were due to Marfan syndrome.

See also
 Marfanoid

References

External links 

Congenital disorders of musculoskeletal system